is a Japanese manga series written and illustrated by Tetsuya Tsutsui. It was serialized in Shueisha's seinen manga magazine Jump X from July 2011 to August 2013. A sequel, titled Yokokuhan: The Copycat, was serialized in the same magazine from April to October 2014 and later transferred to Weekly Young Jump, where it ran from March to July 2015. A live-action film and a five-episode television drama adaptations premiered in 2015.

Media

Manga
Published by Shueisha, it was serialized in Jump X magazine from July 25, 2011, to August 10, 2013, and compiled into three volumes published from April 2012 to September 2013. In North America, it was acquired by Vertical in September 2013. It was also published in Brazil by Editora JBC, and in French by Ki-oon

A spin-off manga, titled Yokokuhan: The Copycat, and illustrated by Fumio Obata started in Jump X on April 10, 2014. With the magazine discontinuation on October 10, 2014, the series moved to Weekly Young Jump, starting on March 11, 2015. The manga finished on July 23, 2015. Yokokuhan: The Copycats three volumes were published between April 2015 and August 2015. It was licensed in France by Ki-oon.

A side-off light novel titled Yokokuhan: The Chaser was published on May 19, 2015.

Volume list

Prophecy

Yokokuhan: The Copycat

Film
A live action film adaptation directed by Yoshihiro Nakamura was released on June 6, 2015. Its North American premiere was held during the LA EigaFest in September 2015. The film was released on DVD and Blu-Ray on December 4, 2015, by TC Entertainment.

Cast
Toma Ikuta as "Newspaper Man"
Erika Toda as Yoshino
Ryohei Suzuki as Kansai
Gaku Hamada as Nobita
Yoshiyoshi Arakawa as Metabo

Drama
Supervised by the film director Yoshihiro Nakamura, it was directed by Nakamura himself, Katsutoshi Hirabayashi and Megumi Sawada, with episodes screenplayed by Tamio Hayashi and Hiroshi Tanaka. It starred Noriyuki Higashiyama and Erika Toda reprises her role from the film. A soundtrack of the series was released on June 3, 2015, by Anchor Records, with all tracks composed by Takashi Omama, the drama's main composer. All episodes were released on DVD and Blu-Ray on December 4, 2015, by TC Entertainment.

Reception
Volume 3 reached the 45th place on the weekly Oricon manga charts and, as of September 15, 2013, has sold 20,871 copies.

On Anime News Network, Rebecca Silverman gave volume 1 an overall grade of A−. On manga-news.com, the series has a staff grade of 16 out of 20.

The film earned  on its opening weekend in Japan and a total of  so far.

References

Further reading

External links
Official manga website 
Official Yokokuhan - The copycat website 
Official film website 

2011 manga
2014 manga
2010s Japanese films
Films directed by Yoshihiro Nakamura
Japanese television dramas based on manga
Live-action films based on manga
Manga adapted into films
Seinen manga
Shueisha manga
Shueisha franchises
Thriller anime and manga
Vertical (publisher) titles
Wowow original programming
Fiction about social media